Sir Peter Reginald Frederick Hall CBE (22 November 1930  11 September 2017) was an English theatre, opera and film director. His obituary in The Times declared him "the most important figure in British theatre for half a century" and on his death, a Royal National Theatre statement declared that Hall's "influence on the artistic life of Britain in the 20th century was unparalleled". In 2018, the Laurence Olivier Awards, recognizing achievements in London theatre, changed the award for Best Director to the Sir Peter Hall Award for Best Director.

In 1955, Hall introduced London audiences to the work of Samuel Beckett with the UK premiere of Waiting for Godot. Hall founded the Royal Shakespeare Company (1960–68) and went on to build an international reputation in theatre, opera, film and television. He was director of the National Theatre (1973–88) and artistic director of Glyndebourne Festival Opera (19841990). He formed the Peter Hall Company (19982011) and became founding director of the Rose Theatre Kingston in 2003. Throughout his career, he was a tenacious champion of public funding for the arts.

Early life and career 
Peter Reginald Frederick Hall was born in Suffolk at Bury St Edmunds, the only son of Grace Florence (née Pamment) and Reginald Edward Arthur Hall. His father was a stationmaster and the family lived for some time at Great Shelford Station. He won a scholarship to The Perse School in Cambridge. Before taking up a further scholarship to read English at St. Catharine's College, Cambridge, Hall did his National Service in Germany at the RAF Headquarters for Education in Bückeburg. Whilst studying at Cambridge he produced and acted in a number of plays, directing five in his final year and a further three for The Marlowe Society Summer Festival. He served on the University Amateur Dramatic Club (ADC) committee before graduating in 1953. In the same year, Hall staged his first professional play, The Letter by W. Somerset Maugham, at The Theatre Royal Windsor. In 1954 and 1955, Hall was the director of the Oxford Playhouse where he directed several later prominent young actors including Ronnie Barker and Billie Whitelaw. Eileen Atkins and Maggie Smith were also part of the company as acting Assistants Stage Managers.

From 1955 to 1957, Hall ran the Arts Theatre in London where he directed the English-language premiere of Waiting for Godot in 1955. The production's success transformed his career overnight and attracted the attention, among others, of Tennessee Williams, for whom he would direct the London premieres of Camino Real (1957) and Cat on a Hot Tin Roof (1958), and Harold Pinter. Other productions at The Arts included the English language premiere of The Waltz of the Toreadors by Jean Anouilh.

Royal Shakespeare Company 
Hall made his debut at the Shakespeare Memorial Theatre in Stratford-upon-Avon in 1956 with Love's Labour's Lost: his productions there in the 19571959 seasons included Cymbeline with Peggy Ashcroft as Imogen, Coriolanus with Laurence Olivier and A Midsummer Night's Dream with Charles Laughton. In 1960, aged 29, Hall succeeded Glen Byam Shaw as director of the theatre, expanded operations to be all-year, and founded the Royal Shakespeare Company (RSC) to realise his vision of a resident ensemble of actors, directors and designers producing both modern and classic texts, with a distinctive house style. The company not only played in Stratford but expanded into the Aldwych Theatre, its first London home.

Hall's many productions for the RSC included Hamlet (1965, with David Warner), The Government Inspector (1966, with Paul Scofield), the world premiere of Harold Pinter's The Homecoming (1965) and The Wars of the Roses (1963) adapted with John Barton from Shakespeare's history plays. The latter was described as "the greatest Shakespearian event in living memory which also laid down the doctrine of Shakespearian relevance to the modern world". Hall left the RSC in 1968 after almost ten years as its director.

At the National Theatre

Hall was appointed director of the National Theatre (NT) in 1973 and led the organisation for fifteen years until 1988. He supervised the move from the Old Vic to the new purpose-built complex on London's South Bank "in the face of wide-spread scepticism and violent union unrest, turning a potential catastrophe into the great success story it remains today." Frustrated by construction delays, Hall decided to move the company into the still-unfinished building and to open it theatre by theatre as each neared completion. Extracts from his production of Tamburlaine the Great with Albert Finney were performed out on the terraces, free to passers-by.

Hall directed thirty-three productions for the NT including the world premieres of Harold Pinter's No Man's Land (1975, with John Gielgud and Ralph Richardson) and Betrayal (1978), Peter Shaffer's Amadeus (1979, with Paul Scofield and Simon Callow), and the London and Broadway premieres of Alan Ayckbourn's Bedroom Farce. Other landmark productions included The Oresteia (in a version by Tony Harrison with music by Harrison Birtwistle, 1981) which became the first Greek play to be performed by a foreign company at the ancient theatre of Epidaurus, Animal Farm (in his own adaptation, 1984) and Antony and Cleopatra with Judi Dench and Anthony Hopkins (1987).

Hall returned to the NT for the last time in 2011 with a production of Twelfth Night mounted by the company to celebrate his eightieth birthday. His daughter, Rebecca Hall, played Viola alongside Simon Callow as Sir Toby Belch in the Cottesloe Theatre.

Later theatre career 
Upon leaving the NT in 1988, Hall launched his own commercial company with productions in the West End and on Broadway of Tennessee Williams' Orpheus Descending (with Vanessa Redgrave) and The Merchant of Venice (with Dustin Hoffman). The Peter Hall Company went on to stage more than sixty plays in association with a number of producing partners including Bill Kenwright and Thelma Holt. In addition to an ensemble repertory season at the Old Vic (1997), the company enjoyed a long collaboration with the Theatre Royal, Bath where a series of summer festivals were staged from 20032011: many productions were subsequently performed on domestic and international tours and in the West End. The plays produced included Oscar Wilde's An Ideal Husband (1992), Pam Gems' Piaf (with Elaine Paige, 1993), Hamlet (with Stephen Dillane, 1994), Henrik Ibsen's The Master Builder (with Alan Bates, 1995), A Streetcar Named Desire (with Jessica Lange, 1995), Julian Barry's Lenny (with Eddie Izzard, 1999), As You Like It (with Rebecca Hall and Dan Stevens, 2003), Brian Clark's Whose Life is it Anyway? (with Kim Cattrall, 2005), the fiftieth anniversary production of Waiting for Godot, Coward's Hay Fever (with Judi Dench, 2006) and Shaw's Pygmalion (with Tim Pigott-Smith and Michelle Dockery, 2007). Hall's final productions for his company were Henry IV, Part 1 and Part 2 (2011), staged at the Theatre Royal Bath.

Hall directed extensively in the United States including the world premiere of John Guare's Four Baboons Adoring the Sun (Lincoln Center, 1992), three Shakespeare plays with Center Theater Group, Los Angeles (1999 and 2001) and John Barton's nine-hour epic Tantalus (2000), an RSC co-production with the Denver Center for the Performing Arts.

In 2003, Hall became the founding director of The Rose Theatre  a new venue to be constructed in Kingston upon Thames whose design was inspired by the Elizabethan original. He directed a number of productions there including Chekhov's Uncle Vanya, which opened the building in 2008, and A Midsummer Night's Dream (with Judi Dench as Titania, 2010). Hall was also appointed "Director Emeritus" of The Rose Kingston.

Opera 
Peter Hall was also an internationally celebrated opera director. His first experience was in 1957, directing The Moon and Sixpence by John Gardner at Sadler's Wells. He was able to play the piano well enough to read opera scores. His first major project was Schoenberg's Moses und Aron at Covent Garden, which led on to further productions at that house.
Hall worked at many of the world's leading houses as well as Royal Opera House, including the Metropolitan Opera in New York, Houston Grand Opera, Los Angeles Opera, Lyric Opera of Chicago and the Bayreuth Festival where he, with conductor Georg Solti, directed Wagner's Ring Cycle (Der Ring des Nibelungen) in 1983 to honour the centenary of the composer's death. The production was played until 1986. Hall staged the world premieres of Michael Tippett's The Knot Garden (1970) and New Year (1989). He had a close relationship with the Glyndebourne Festival where he was artistic director from 1984 to 1990, directing more than twenty productions including the Mozart/Da Ponte operas. His production of Benjamin Britten's A Midsummer Night's Dream (1981) was revived nine times, most recently 35 years after its premiere, in August 2016. Hall also directed Albert Herring by Benjamin Britten, Cavalli's La Calisto, Monteverdi's Il ritorno d'Ulisse in patria and Gluck's Orfeo ed Euridice (all with Janet Baker); L'incoronazione di Poppea and Carmen – both with his then wife, Maria Ewing, with whom he also staged a celebrated Salome (The Royal Opera London and L.A. Opera) in 1986. Opera magazine noted Hall's characteristics as (in relation to La Cenerentola at Glyndebourne) "dignity and emotional veracity", recalling that "he would always insist that 'the singers, like actors, played off each other'".

Film and TV 

Hall's films for cinema and TV include Akenfield (1974), a fictionalisation based on Ronald Blythe's oral history and filmed in Blythe's native Suffolk with a cast of local people. It was restored and relaunched in 2016 by the BFI. Hall's film She's Been Away was written by Stephen Poliakoff and starred Peggy Ashcroft and Geraldine James who both won awards for their performances at the Venice Film Festival. Hall also directed The Camomile Lawn and The Final Passage for Channel 4 television, as well as a number of his opera and stage productions. His only American studio movie, the 1995 erotic thriller Never Talk to Strangers, "proved to me that I have no aptitude whatever for surviving the Hollywood rat race," as Hall wrote in the updated edition of his memoir Making an Exhibition of Myself. For several years during the 1970s he presented the arts programme Aquarius for London Weekend Television. In 2005 he was the subject of a two-hour documentary for The South Bank Show, Peter Hall, Fifty Years in Theatre.

Acting 
Hall began acting as a student at Cambridge University, where Dadie Rylands taught him to speak Shakespearean verse. He was also influenced in his understanding of Shakespeare by the literary critic and teacher F. R. Leavis. He subsequently acted in three German films in the 1970s: Der Fußgänger (The Pedestrian, directed by Maximilian Schell, 1973), Als Mutter streikte (When Mother Went on Strike, 1974) and Der letzte Schrei (The Last Word, 1974).

Books 
His books on theatre include The Necessary Theatre (Nick Hern, 1999), Exposed by the Mask (Oberon, 2000) and Shakespeare's Advice to the Players (Oberon, 2003). The Peter Hall Diaries  the Story of a Dramatic Battle, edited by John Goodwin (Hamish Hamilton) were first published in 1983 and documented his struggle to establish the National Theatre on the South Bank. His autobiography, Making an Exhibition of Myself (Sinclair-Stevenson), was published in 1993.

Awards 
Peter Hall was appointed a CBE in 1963 and knighted in 1977 for his services to the theatre. He was awarded the Chevalier de L'Ordre des Arts et des Lettres (1965), received the Hamburg University Shakespeare Prize (1967) and was elected Member of the Athens Academy for Services to Greek Drama (2004). His professional awards and nominations included two Tony Awards (The Homecoming and Amadeus) and four awards for lifetime achievement in the arts. In 2005 Hall was inducted into the American Theater Hall of Fame. He was Chancellor of Kingston University (20002013), held the Wortham Chair in Performing Arts at the University of Houston (19992002) and was awarded honorary doctorates from a number of universities including Cambridge, York, Liverpool, Bath and London.

Personal life 

Hall was married four times. He had six children and nine grandchildren. His first wife was French actress Leslie Caron, with whom he had a son, Christopher (b. 1957), and a daughter, Jennifer (b. 1958). With his second wife, Jacqueline Taylor, he had a son, Edward (b. 1966), and a daughter, Lucy (b. 1969). Hall married American opera singer Maria Ewing in 1982 with whom he had one daughter, Rebecca (b. 1982). He was finally married to Nicki Frei; the couple had one daughter, Emma (b. 1992).

Hall worked with all his children: for the National Theatre, Jennifer played Miranda in The Tempest (1988); Rebecca, aged nine, played young Sophie in the Channel 4 adaptation of The Camomile Lawn, for The Peter Hall Company she played Vivie in Mrs Warren's Profession (2002), Rosalind in As You Like It (2003), Maria in Gallileo's Daughter (2004) and, for the NT, Viola in Twelfth Night (2011); Emma, aged two, played Joseph in Jacob (2004, TV Movie); for the Peter Hall Company, Lucy designed Hamlet (1994), Cuckoos (2003) and Whose Life is it Anyway? (2005); Christopher produced the Channel 4 television drama The Final Passage (1996); Edward co-directed the stage epic Tantalus (2000).

Hall was diagnosed with dementia in 2011 and retired from public life.

Hall was described by Guardian contributor Mark Lawson as a "committed atheist, from as early as his 20s", leading "to a punishing work rate in his hurry to get everything done".

Death and legacy 
On 11 September 2017, Hall died from pneumonia at University College Hospital, London, surrounded by family. He was 86 years old.

His obituary in The Times declared him "the most important figure in British theatre for half a century" and a Royal National Theatre statement declared that Hall's "influence on the artistic life of Britain in the 20th century was unparalleled".

Many luminaries of British theatre paid tribute to Hall. Nicholas Hytner said: "Without him there would have been no Royal Shakespeare Company."<ref name="auto">"Sir Peter Hall, Royal Shakespeare Company founder, dies aged 86". Daily Telegraph', 12 September 2017.</ref> Trevor Nunn said: "Not only a thrilling director, he was the great impresario of the age." Richard Eyre called Hall the "godfather" of British theatre: "Peter created the template of the modern director – part-magus, part-impresario, part-politician, part celebrity." Impresario Cameron Mackintosh said: "It's thanks to Peter Hall that people like Trevor Nunn, Nicholas Hytner and Sam Mendes transformed musical theatre around the world." Theatre critic Michael Coveney said that he believed Hall's production of The Wars of the Roses "recast the [Shakespeare] history plays and put them at the centre of our culture".

Peter Brook said: "Peter was a man for all seasons – he could play any part that was needed". Elaine Paige said: "Peter Hall had absolute authority and, as a heavyweight of the theatre, real presence." Griff Rhys Jones said: "Peter was an absolute smoothie, the most charming and diplomatic man" and Samuel West said "Peter was an extraordinarily energetic, imaginative director – if you left him in the corner of a room he'd direct a play – but he was also a great campaigner. He never stopped arguing for the role of subsidised art in a civilised society and its ability to change people's lives."

In April 2018, the Society of London Theatre, which presents the annual Laurence Olivier Awards recognizing achievements in London theatre, changed the award for Best Director to the Sir Peter Hall Award for Best Director.

 Selected works 
 Stage productions 
Hall published a complete list of his productions in his autobiography:

 The Letter (W. Somerset Maugham, Theatre Royal Windsor) 1953
 Blood Wedding (Lorca, London debut, Arts Theatre) 1954
 The Impresario from Smyrna (Goldoni, Arts Theatre) 1954
 The Immoralist (Gide, Arts Theatre) 1954
 Listen to the Wind (Angela Jeans, music by Vivian Ellis, Arts Theatre) 1954
 The Lesson (Ionesco, Arts Theatre) 1955
 South (Julian Green, Arts Theatre) 1955
 Mourning Becomes Electra (O'Neill, Arts Theatre) 1955
 Waiting for Godot (Beckett, English-language world premiere, Arts Theatre) 1955
 The Burnt Flower-Bed (Ugo Betti, Arts Theatre) 1955
 Summertime (Ugo Betti, Arts Theatre) 1955
 The Waltz of the Toreadors (Jean Anouilh, English-language premiere, Arts Theatre) 1956
 Gigi (Colette, New Theatre) 1956
 Love's Labours Lost (Shakespeare, Stratford-on-Avon) 1956
 The Gates of Summer (John Whiting, New Theatre Oxford) 1956
 Camino Real (Tennessee Williams, Phoenix Theatre, London) 1957
 The Moon and Sixpence (John Gardner, opera debut, Sadlers Wells) 1957
 Cymbeline (Shakespeare, Stratford-on-Avon) 1957
 The Rope Dancers (Morton Wishengard, New York debut, Cort Theatre) 1957
 Cat on a Hot Tin Roof (Tennessee Williams, Comedy Theatre) 1958
 Twelfth Night (Shakespeare, Stratford-on-Avon) 1958
 Brouhaha (George Tabori, Aldwych) 1958
 Shadow of Heroes (Robert Ardrey, Piccadilly Theatre) 1958
 Madame de… (Anouilh, Arts Theatre) 1959
 Traveller Without Luggage (Anouilh, Arts Theatre) 1959
 A Midsummer Night's Dream (Shakespeare, Stratford-on-Avon) 1959
 Coriolanus (Shakespeare, Stratford-on-Avon) 1959
 The Wrong Side of the Park (John Mortimer, Cambridge Theatre) 1959
 The Two Gentlemen of Verona (Shakespeare, Royal Shakespeare Company) 1960
 Twelfth Night (Shakespeare, RSC) 1960
 Troilus and Cressida (Shakespeare, RSC) 1960
 Ondine (Giradoux, RSC, Aldwych) 1961
 Becket (Anouilh, RSC, Aldwych) 1961
 Romeo and Juliet (Shakespeare, RSC) 1961
 A Midsummer Night's Dream (Shakespeare, RSC) 1962
 The Collection (Pinter, RSC) 1962
 Troilus and Cressida (Shakespeare, RSC) 1962
 The Wars of the Roses (adapted with John Barton from Shakespeare's  Henry VI Parts 1, 2 and 3 and Richard III, RSC) 1963
 Edward IV (Shakespeare, RSC) 1963
 Richard II (Shakespeare, RSC) 1964
 Henry IV Parts 1 and 2 (Shakespeare, RSC) 1964
 Henry V (Shakespeare, RSC) 1964
 Eh? (Henry Livings, RSC, Aldwych) 1964
 The Homecoming (Pinter, world premiere, RSC) 1965
 Moses and Aaron (Schoenberg, UK premiere, Royal Opera House) 1965
 Hamlet (Shakespeare, RSC) 1965
 The Government Inspector (Gogol, RSC, Aldwych) 1966
 The Magic Flute (Mozart, Royal Opera House) 1966
 Staircase (Charles Wood, RSC, Aldwych) 1966
 Macbeth (Shakespeare, RSC) 1967
 A Delicate Balance (Edward Albee, RSC, Aldwych) 1969
 Dutch Uncle (Simon Gray, RSC, Aldwych) 1969
 Landscape and Silence (Pinter, world premieres, RSC, Aldwych) 1969
 The Knot Garden (Tippett, world premiere, Royal Opera House) 1970
 La Calisto (Cavalli, Glyndebourne debut, Glyndebourne Festival Opera) 1970
 The Battle of Shrivings (Shaffer, Lyric Theatre) 1970
 Eugene Onegin (Tchaikovsky, Royal Opera House) 1971
 Old Times (Harold Pinter, world premiere, RSC Aldwych) 1971
 Tristan und Isolde (Wagner, Royal Opera House) 1971
 All Over (Edward Albee, RSC, Aldwych) 1972
 Il Ritorno d'Ulisse (Monteverdi, Glyndebourne Festival Opera) 1972
 Via Galactica (lyrics by Christopher Gore, music by Galt McDermot, New York) 1972
 Le Nozze di Figaro (Mozart, Glyndebourne Festival Opera) 1973
 The Tempest (Shakespeare, National Theatre) 1973
 John Gabriel Borkman (Ibsen, NT) 1974
 Happy Days (Beckett, NT) 1974
 No Man's Land (Pinter, world premiere, NT) 1975
 Hamlet (Shakespeare, official opening of the Lyttelton, NT) 1975
 Judgement (Barry Collins, NT) 1975
 Tamburlaine the Great (Christopher Marlowe, official opening of the Olivier, NT) 1976
 Bedroom Farce (Ayckbourn, also co-director, London and US premieres, NT and Broadway) 1977
 Don Giovanni (Mozart, Glyndebourne Festival Opera) 1977
 Volpone (Ben Jonson, NT) 1977
 The Country Wife (Wycherley, NT) 1977
 Cosi fan Tutte (Mozart, Glyndebourne Festival Opera) 1978
 The Cherry Orchard (Chekhov, NT) 1978
 Macbeth (Shakespeare, NT) 1978
 Betrayal (Pinter, world premiere, NT) 1978
 Fidelio (Beethoven, Glyndebourne Festival Opera) 1979
 Amadeus (Peter Shaffer, world premiere, NT) 1979
 Othello (Shakespeare, NT) 1980
 A Midsummer Night's Dream (Britten, Glyndebourne Festival Opera) 1981
 The Oresteia (Aeschylus, trans. Harrison, NT and Epidaurus) 1981
 Orfeo et Eurydice (Gluck, Glyndebourne Festival Opera) 1982
 The Importance of Being Earnest (Wilde, NT) 1982
 Macbeth (Verdi, Metropolitan Opera, New York) 1982
 Other Places (Pinter, world premiere, NT) 1982
 Der Ring des Nibelungen (Wagner, Bayreuth Festival Opera) 1983
 Jean Seberg (lyrics by Christopher Adler, book by Julian Barry, music by Marvin Hamlisch, NT) 1983
 Animal Farm (George Orwell, adapted by Hall, NT) 1984
 Coriolanus (Shakespeare, NT and Athens) 1984
 L'Incoronazione di Poppea (Monteverdi, Glyndebourne Festival Opera) 1984
 Yonadab (Shaffer, world premiere, NT) 1985
 Carmen (Bizet, Glyndebourne) 1985
 Albert Herring (Britten, Glyndebourne) 1985
 The Petition (Brian Clark, NT) 1986
 Simon Boccanegra (Verdi, Glyndebourne) 1986
 Salome (Strauss, LA Opera) 1986
 Coming in to Land (Poliakoff, world premiere, NT) 1986
 Antony and Cleopatra (Shakespeare, NT) 1987
 La Traviata (Verdi, Glyndebourne) 1987
 Entertaining Strangers (David Edgar, NT) 1987
 Cymbeline (Shakespeare, NT, Moscow and Epidaurus) 1988
 The Winter's Tale (Shakespeare, NT, Moscow and Epidaurus) 1988
 The Tempest (Shakespeare, NT, Moscow and Epidaurus) 1988
 Falstaff (Verdi, Glyndebourne) 1988
 Orpheus Descending (Tennessee Williams, Peter Hall Company, Haymarket and Broadway) 1988/9
 The Merchant of Venice (Shakespeare, PHCo, Phoenix Theatre and Broadway) 1989/90
 New Year (Tippett, world premiere, Houston Opera) 1989
 Le Nozze di Figaro (Mozart, Glyndebourne) 1989
 The Wild Duck (Ibsen, trans. Hall/Ewbank, PHCo, Phoenix Theatre) 1990
 Born Again  (after Ionesco's Rhinoceros, lyrics by Julian Barry, music by Jason Carr, PHCo/Chichester Festival Theatre) 1990
 The Homecoming (Pinter, PHCo Comedy Theatre) 1990
 Twelfth Night (Shakespeare, PHCo, Playhouse Theatre) 1991
 Tartuffe (Moliere, trans. Bolt, PHCo, Playhouse Theatre) 1991
 The Rose Tattoo (Tennessee Williams, PHCo, Playhouse Theatre) 1991
 Four Baboons Adoring the Sun (John Guare, world premiere, Lincoln Center) 1992
 Sienna Red (Poliakoff, PHCo, Liverpool Playhouse) 1992
 All's Well That Ends Well (Shakespeare, RSC, Swan) 1992
 The Gift of the Gorgon (Shaffer, world premiere, RSC, Barbican and Wyndham's Theatre) 1992
 An Ideal Husband (Wilde, PHCo/Bill Kenwright Ltd, Globe Theatre and Broadway) 1992
 The Magic Flute (Mozart, LA Opera) 1993
 Separate Tables (Rattigan, PHCo/BKL, Albery Theatre) 1993
 Lysistrata (Aristophanes, trans. Bolt, PHCo/BKL, Old Vic, Wyndham's and Epidaurus) 1993
 She Stoops to Conquer (Goldsmith, PHCo/BKL, Queen's Theatre) 1993
 Piaf (Pam Gems, PHCo/BKL, Piccadilly Theatre) 1993
 An Absolute Turkey (Feydeau, trans. Hall/Frei, PHCo/BKL, Globe Theatre) 1994
 On Approval (Lonsdale, PHCo/BKL, Playhouse Theatre) 1994
 Hamlet (Shakespeare, PHCo/BKL, Gielgud Theatre) 1994
 The Master Builder (Ibsen, trans. Hall/Ewbank, PHCo/BKL, Haymarket) 1995
 Julius Caesar (Shakespeare, RSC) 1995
 Mind Millie for Me (Feydeau, trans. Hall/Frei, PHCo/BKL, Haymarket) 1996
 The Oedipus Plays (Sophocles, trans. Bolt, NT, Athens and Epidaurus) 1996
 A Streetcar Named Desire (Tennessee Williams, PHCo/BKL, Haymarket) 1997
 Waste (Granville Barker, PHCo, Old Vic) 1997
 The Seagull (Chekhov, trans. Stoppard, PHCo, Old Vic) 1997
 Waiting for Godot (Beckett, PHCo, Old Vic) 1997
 King Lear (Shakespeare, PHCo, Old Vic) 1997
 The School for Wives (Moliere, trans. Bolt, PHCo/BKL, Picadilly Theatre) 1997
 The Misanthrope (Moliere, trans. Bolt, PHCo/BKL, Piccadilly Theatre) 1998
 Major Barbara (George Bernard Shaw, PHCo/BKL, Piccadilly) 1998
 Filumena (de Fillipo, PHCo/BKL, Piccadilly) 1998
 Amadeus (Shaffer, PHCo, Old Vic and Broadway) 1998/9
 Kafka's Dick (Alan Bennett, PHCo/BKL Piccadilly) 1998
 Measure for Measure (Shakespeare, Center Theater Group, Los Angeles) 1999
 A Midsummer Night's Dream (Shakespeare, Center Theater Group, LA) 1999
 Lenny (Julian Barry, PHCo, Queen's Theatre) 1999
 Cuckoos (Manfredi, trans. Teevan, PHCo, Gate Theatre) 2000
 Tantalus (John Barton, world premiere, RSC/Denver Center for the Performing Arts, Denver, UK tour and Barbican) 2000/1
 Romeo and Juliet (Shakespeare, Center Theater Group, LA) 2001
 Japes (Simon Gray, world premiere, PHCo, Haymarket) 2001
 Troilus and Cressida (Shakespeare, Theatre for a New Audience, off-Broadway) 2001
 Otello (Verdi, Glyndebourne and Lyric Opera, Chicago) 2001
 The Royal Family (Ferber, PHCo, Haymarket) 2001
 Lady Windermere's Fan (Wilde, PHCo, Haymarket) 2002
 The Bacchai (Euripides, trans. Teevan, NT and Epidaurus) 2002
 Albert Herring (Britten, Glyndebourne) 2002
 Mrs Warren's Profession (Shaw, PHCo, Strand Theatre) 2002
 Where There's a Will (Feydeau, trans. Frei, PHCo/Theatre Royal Bath) 2003
 Betrayal (Pinter, PHCo/Theatre Royal Bath, UK tour and West End) 2003
 Design for Living (Coward, PHCo/Theatre Royal Bath and UK tour) 2003
 As You Like It (Shakespeare, PHCo/Theatre Royal Bath, UK and US tour) 2003/4
 Le Nozze di Figaro (Mozart, Lyric Opera Chicago) 2003
 Happy Days (Beckett, PHCo/Theatre Royal Bath and Arts Theatre) 2003
 Man and Superman (Shaw, PHCo/Theatre Royal Bath) 2004
 Gallileo's Daughter (Timberlake Wertenbaker, world premiere, PHCo/Theatre Royal Bath) 2004
 The Dresser (Harwood, PHCo/Theatre Royal Bath, UK tour and West End) 2004
 Whose Life is it Anyway? (Brian Clark, PHCo/Sonia Friedman Productions, Duke of York's) 2005
 La Cenerentola  (Rossini, Glyndebourne) 2005
 Much Ado About Nothing (Shakespeare, PHCo/Theatre Royal Bath) 2005
 You Never Can Tell (Shaw, PHCo/Theatre Royal Bath and West End) 2005
 Waiting for Godot (Beckett, 50th anniversary production, PHCo/Theatre Royal Bath, UK tour and West End) 2005/6
 A Midsummer Marriage (Tippett, Lyric Opera Chicago) 2005
 The Importance of Being Earnest (Wilde, Los Angeles and New York) 2006
 Hay Fever (Coward, PHCo/Bill Kenwright Ltd, Haymarket) 2006
 Measure for Measure (Shakespeare, PHCo/Theatre Royal Bath) 2006
 Habeas Corpus (Alan Bennett, PHCo/Theatre Royal Bath and UK tour) 2006
 Amy's View (David Hare, PHCo/Theatre Royal Bath, UK tour and West End) 2006
 Old Times (Pinter, PHCo/Theatre Royal Bath and UK tour) 2007
 Little Nell (Simon Gray, world premiere, PHCo/Theatre Royal Bath) 2007
 Pygmalion (Shaw, PHCo/Theatre Royal Bath and Old Vic) 2007/8
 The Vortex (Coward, PHCo/BKL, Windsor, UK tour and West End) 2007/8
 Uncle Vanya (Chekhov, trans. Mulrine, English Touring Theatre, Rose Kingston and UK tour) 2008
 The Portrait of a Lady (Henry James, adapted by Frei, PHCo/Theatre Royal Bath and Rose Kingston) 2008
 A Doll's House (Ibsen, trans. Mulrine, PHCo/Theatre Royal Bath and Rose Kingston) 2008
 Love's Labours Lost (Shakespeare, Rose Kingston) 2008
 The Browning Version (Rattigan, PHCo/Theatre Royal Bath and UK tour) 2009
 The Apple Cart (Shaw, PHCo/Theatre Royal Bath) 2009
 A Midsummer Night's Dream (Shakespeare, PHCo, Rose Kingston) 2010
 Bedroom Farce (Ayckbourn, PHCo/BKL, Rose Kingston and West End) 2010
 The Rivals (Sheridan, PHCo/Theatre Royal Bath, UK tour and West End) 2010
 Twelfth Night (Shakespeare, NT) 2011
 Henry IV Parts 1 and 2 (Shakespeare, PHCo/Theatre Royal Bath) 2011

Film and television
Hall published a complete list of his films in his autobiography:

 Work Is a Four-Letter Word (1968)
 A Midsummer Night's Dream (1968)
 Three into Two Won't Go (1969)
 Perfect Friday (1970)
 The Homecoming (1973)
 Akenfield (1974)
 When Mother Went on Strike (1974)
 Aquarius TV (presenter: 1975–1976)
 She's Been Away (BBC Films, 1989: wins two awards at the Venice Film Festival)
 The Camomile Lawn (Channel 4 TV mini-series, 1992)
 Jacob (TV movie, 1994)
 Never Talk to Strangers (1995)
 The Final Passage (Channel 4 TV, 1996)

Books
 The Wars of the Roses (with John Barton: BBC Books) 1970
 John Gabriel Borkman (Ibsen, trans. with Inga-Stina Ewbank: Athlone Press) 1975
 Peter Hall's Diaries: the Story of a Dramatic Battle (ed. John Goodwin: Hamish Hamilton) 1983; reissued (Oberon Books) 2000
 Animal Farm (stage adaptation of George Orwell's novel: Heinemann Press/Methuen) 1986
 The Wild Duck (Henrik Ibsen, trans. with Inga-Stina Ewbank: Absolute Classics) 1990
 Making An Exhibition of Myself (autobiography: Sinclair-Stevenson Ltd) 1993; updated (Oberon Books) 2000
 An Absolute Turkey (Georges Feydeau, trans. with Nicki Frei: Oberon Books) 1994
 The Master Builder (Ibsen, trans. with Inga-Stina Ewbank) 1995
 The Necessary Theatre (Nick Hern Books) 1990
 Exposed by the Mask: Form and Language in Drama (Oberon Books) 2000
 Shakespeare's Advice to the Players'' (Oberon Books) 2003

References

Further reading

External links
 The Company: A Biographical Dictionary of the RSC: Online database
 Peter Hall at the British Film Institute
 
 
 
 Peter Hall video at Web of Stories
 Fathom biography
 Interview with Peter Hall, 5 November 1987 (about opera)
Parliament & the Sixties- Peter Hall- 1967 Theatre Censorship – UK Parliament Living Heritage

1930 births
2017 deaths
Alumni of St Catharine's College, Cambridge
British opera directors
Commanders of the Order of the British Empire
Drama Desk Award winners
English atheists
English film directors
English television directors
English theatre directors
Knights Bachelor
Laurence Olivier Award winners
Opera managers
People associated with Kingston University
People educated at The Perse School
People from Bury St Edmunds
Tony Award winners
People from Great Shelford
Deaths from pneumonia in England